This is a list of administrators and governors of Anambra State. 
Anambra State, Nigeria, was formed on 3 February 1976 when East-Central State was divided into Anambra and Imo (Owerri) states.

See also 
States of Nigeria
List of Nigerian state governors

References

Anambra